The Men's 200 metre backstroke competition of the 2014 FINA World Swimming Championships (25 m) will be held on 7 December.

Records
Prior to the competition, the existing world and championship records were as follows.

Results

Heats
The heats were held at 09:38.

Final
The final was held at 18:15.

References

2014 FINA World Swimming Championships (25 m)